The 2017 Trofeo TCR Italy was the inaugural edition of the Trofeo TCR Italy run at the 2017 Bologna Motor Show. The event featured cars and teams from the TCR Italy Touring Car Championship duelling at a temporary racetrack. The event was won by Giacomo Altoè.

Entry List

Race

References

Trofeo TCR Italy
Trofeo TCR Italy